is a town located in Higashimorokata District, Miyazaki Prefecture, Japan.

As of October 1, 2019, the town has an estimated population of 7,023 and the density of 73.8 persons per km². The total area is 95.19 km².

Aya's town constitution gives it one of the tightest recycling policies in Japan. It is included into Aya Biosphere Reserve transition zone.

Aya is also home to Aya Castle.

Geography

Neighbouring municipalities 

 Miyazaki Prefecture
 Miyazaki
 Kobayashi
 Kunitomi
 Nishimera

Economy

Aya is the most famous place in Miyazaki for wine making. Most people depend on the winery as a profession. There is a winery for tourists to visit in area.

Important festivals and events

Aya has several festivals in the course of the year.
In March, they have the Cherry Blossom festival. (Sakuraokosi)
In November, they have a horse race.
Also in November, they have a 'Making of Aya' festival.

Transportation 
Aya did not have any national routes and train stations that passes through the town. The closest airport to Aya is Miyazaki Airport.

References

External links

Aya official website 
Aya official website 

Towns in Miyazaki Prefecture